Valerio Giambalvo (born 8 July 1968) is an Italian backstroke, butterfly and freestyle swimmer. He competed in four events at the 1988 Summer Olympics.

References

External links
 

1968 births
Living people
Italian male backstroke swimmers
Italian male butterfly swimmers
Italian male freestyle swimmers
Olympic swimmers of Italy
Swimmers at the 1988 Summer Olympics
Sportspeople from Palermo
20th-century Italian people